Gwilym Lloyd George, 1st Viscount Tenby,  (4 December 1894 – 14 February 1967), was a Welsh politician and cabinet minister. The younger son of David Lloyd George, he served as Home Secretary from 1954 to 1957.

Background, education and military service

Born at Criccieth in North Wales, Lloyd George was the second son of Liberal Prime Minister David Lloyd George and his first wife, Margaret, daughter of Richard Owen. His sister Megan was also active in politics, but the two moved in opposite political directions – Gwilym to the right, towards the Conservatives, and Megan to the left, eventually joining the Labour Party.

Educated at Eastbourne College and Jesus College, Cambridge, Lloyd George was commissioned into the Royal Welch Fusiliers in 1914.  In 1915 he became Aide-de-camp to Major-General Ivor Philipps, commander of the 38th (Welsh) Division. He transferred to the Anti-Aircraft branch of the Royal Garrison Artillery in 1916 and rose to the rank of Major, being known for most of his political career as Major Lloyd George. He was also mentioned in despatches.

Early political career 1922–45

Leaving the army in 1918, Lloyd George found employment working with his father in the post war coalition government. This also included being a trustee for David Lloyd George's National Liberal Political Fund.

Lloyd George was Member of Parliament (MP) for Pembrokeshire from 1922 to 1924, and again from 1929 to 1950. He was initially elected as a National Liberal, but then joined the re-united Liberal Party in 1923. In 1931, Lloyd George initially took ministerial office as Parliamentary Secretary to the Board of Trade in the National Government of Ramsay Macdonald, but resigned when his father David Lloyd George withdrew his support from the government. Gwilym Lloyd George was subsequently a member of the Independent Liberal group from 1931 to 1935, who were opposed to the continuation of the National Government. This group then subsequently returned to the main Liberal Party following the 1935 general election.

In 1939, Lloyd George joined Neville Chamberlain's government for the same post he resigned from in 1931. From then on Lloyd George operated in effect as an independent Liberal. In 1941, he was appointed to the office of Parliamentary Secretary to the Ministry of Food and then Minister of Fuel and Power in 1942. Lloyd George stayed in the post until the 1945 general election It was after the death of his father in 1945 that Gwilym began hyphenating his surname as Lloyd-George.

Later political career, 1945 onward
Following the 1945 general election in which he stood as a National Liberal and Conservative, and was returned by a majority of 168, Lloyd George was approached by the Liberal Party and its rival the Liberal National Party to chair their respective political organisations. Lloyd George turned them both down. Winston Churchill offered him a position in the Conservative Party's Shadow cabinet but was allowed to remain as a 'Liberal'. In 1946 Lloyd-George formally lost the Liberal Party whip. 

From this point onwards he did not associate with his erstwhile Liberal colleagues (who included his sister Lady Megan) and he was openly supported by Conservatives in his constituency. In early January 1950 he was publicly disowned by the Liberal Party for supporting Conservative candidates in constituencies contested by a Liberal candidate.

Lloyd-George lost his seat (standing again as a National Liberal and Conservative) in the 1950 general election. The Liberal Party did not field a candidate against him but this time Lloyd George lost to a Labour Party candidate Desmond Donnelly by 129 votes. His career in Welsh politics at an end, a year later Lloyd-George returned to parliament as a National Liberal for Newcastle upon Tyne North in the 1951 general election. His candidature was backed by Churchill although disgruntled Conservatives in the local party supported an independent against Lloyd George.

Returning to office, Prime Minister Winston Churchill appointed him Minister of Food 1951–1954, and Home Secretary and Minister for Welsh Affairs from 1954 until his retirement in 1957. Lloyd-George was raised to the peerage as Viscount Tenby, of Bulford in the County of Pembroke, on 12 February 1957 and took his seat in the House of Lords on 27 February. 

In 1955, during his time as Home Secretary, he had refused to commute the death sentence imposed on Ruth Ellis; she was the last woman to be executed in the UK.

Family
Lloyd George married Edna Gwenfron, daughter of David Jones, in 1921. They had two children: David Lloyd George, 2nd Viscount Tenby (1922–1983), and William Lloyd George, 3rd Viscount Tenby (born 1927). He died aged 72, and was succeeded by his eldest son, David.

Lady Tenby died in 1971.

References

Sources

Further reading

External links 
 
 David Lloyd George Exhibition, National Library of Wales

1894 births
1967 deaths
Alumni of Jesus College, Cambridge
British Army personnel of World War I
Children of prime ministers of the United Kingdom
Conservative Party (UK) MPs for English constituencies
Liberal Party (UK) MPs for Welsh constituencies
Gwilym
Members of the Parliament of the United Kingdom for English constituencies
Members of the Parliament of the United Kingdom for Pembrokeshire constituencies
Members of the Privy Council of the United Kingdom
Ministers in the Chamberlain wartime government, 1939–1940
Ministers in the Churchill caretaker government, 1945
Ministers in the Churchill wartime government, 1940–1945
Ministers in the Eden government, 1955–1957
Ministers in the third Churchill government, 1951–1955
National Liberal Party (UK, 1922) politicians
National Liberal Party (UK, 1931) politicians
Parliamentary Secretaries to the Board of Trade
People educated at Eastbourne College
People from Caernarfonshire
Royal Garrison Artillery officers
Royal Welch Fusiliers officers
Secretaries of State for the Home Department
UK MPs 1922–1923
UK MPs 1923–1924
UK MPs 1929–1931
UK MPs 1931–1935
UK MPs 1935–1945
UK MPs 1945–1950
UK MPs 1951–1955
UK MPs 1955–1959
UK MPs who were granted peerages
Younger sons of earls
Viscounts created by Elizabeth II